Beixiaguan Subdistrict is a subdistrict located in the southeastern part of the Haidian District, Beijing.  

Beijing Jiaotong University is situated in this area.

The region was named Beixiaguan for its location outside of North Pass of the Xizhimen.

History

Geography 
Beixiaguan Subdistrict extends from the Jingbao Railway in the east and adjacent to Beitaipingzhuang Street, and in the west to Zhongguancun South Street and Zizhuyuan Street in the north. The North Third Ring West Road is adjacent to Zhongguancun Street, and the south to the Nanchang River, the west boundary of Beijing Zoo, and the section of Xizhimenwai Street to the south of the Capital Gymnasium is connected to the exhibition road of Xicheng District.

Administrative Divisions 
As of 2021, Beixiaguan Subdistrict was subdivided into 31 communities:

See also 
 List of township-level divisions of Beijing

References 

Haidian District
Subdistricts of Beijing